Sverre Brandt (3 March 1880 – 16 July 1962) was a Norwegian theatre worker and playwright, born in Trondheim. He is remembered for his children's play Reisen til Julestjernen from 1924, which has been staged numerous times at theatres in Scandinavia, and also adapted into a film. He was financial manager at Nationaltheatret from 1919 to 1948.

Further reading

References

1880 births
1962 deaths
People from Trondheim
20th-century Norwegian dramatists and playwrights
Norwegian male dramatists and playwrights